Al Final de Este Viaje is the second album by the Cuban singer-songwriter Silvio Rodríguez, released in 1978.

Album 
The album was recorded in Madrid, Spain at Sonoland Studios, in 1978. The album shows Silvio Rodriguez accompanied only by his acoustic guitar, and includes songs composed between 1968 and 1970. It is one of his most direct works, without the use of larger arrangements.

It includes some of his classic songs such as Ojalá, Canción del Elegido and Óleo de Mujer Con Sombrero.

Track list

Personnel 
Silvio Rodríguez – guitar, vocals

Production 
Sonoland (Madrid, 1978).
Production: Pedro Orlando
Sound: José Antonio Álvarez Alija

External links 
 "Al final de este viaje", explication of the lyrics
 Lyrics of "Al final de este viaje"

1978 albums
Silvio Rodríguez albums
Spanish-language albums